Old North St. Louis is a neighborhood just north and slightly west of the downtown area of St. Louis, Missouri. It is known for Crown Candy Kitchen, historic 19th-century brick homes, and its community gardens.

History 
The neighborhood now known as Old North St. Louis was established as the independent village of North St. Louis in 1816 and was annexed by the City of St. Louis in 1841. After many generations as a densely populated neighborhood, Old North St. Louis experienced decades of population losses and deterioration of the community's housing stock. In the late 20th and early 21st centuries, the neighborhood began a revitalization.

Three separate National Register Historic Districts are located within the boundaries of Old North St. Louis. In the portion of the neighborhood north of St. Louis Avenue, dozens of homes have been rehabbed by individuals and families over the past 25 years. Along North Market Street and one block to the south along Monroe Avenue, new homes have been built and large, formerly crumbling, historic buildings have been rehabbed as affordable apartments.

A 27 building, a $35 million redevelopment of the former 14th Street pedestrian mall was to be built in partnership with Old North St. Louis Restoration Group, a neighborhood association. In 2013, the project lost federal funding.

Education 
Schools include Ames Visual and Performing Arts magnet school and Confluence Academy charter school.

Churches 
The neighborhood is also home to several churches, such as Saints Cyril & Methodius Polish National Catholic Church, Fourth Baptist Church, Greater Leonard Missionary Baptist, True Gospel Temple, Revival Center Church of God in Christ, and Parrish Temple CME.

Mullanphy Emigrant Home 
Among the neighborhood's landmark structures is the "Mullanphy Emigrant Home" building, constructed in 1867 to provide temporary shelter and supportive services to the thousands of immigrants who settled in St. Louis during the years following the Civil War. In the late 19th/early 20th centuries, part of Old North St. Louis was predominantly Irish in population; that section was known as "Kerry Patch".

Demographics
In 2020, the neighborhood's population was 82.5% Black, 12.8% White, 0.1% Native American, 0.1% Asian, 4.3% two or more races, and 0.3% other races. 1.1% of the population was of Hispanic and/or Latino origin.

References

Sources

Further reading 

  Kleaver, Patrick J. Growing up in Old North St. Louis. 2012. ISBN 9781478162131

External links 

 History Happened Here - A Virtual Tour of St. Louis' Cultural Communities
 Old North Saint Louis neighborhood website

Neighborhoods in St. Louis